The 2013 Carinthian state election was held on 3 March 2013 to elect the members of the Landtag of Carinthia.

The election saw a massive shift in Carinthian politics, which had been dominated by the Freedom Party in Carinthia (FPK) and Governor Jörg Haider since the 1990s. After Haider's death in 2008, he was succeeded by Gerhard Dörfler. After winning the 2009 election, Dörfler's government suffered a string of scandals and the FPK's popularity plummeted. Ultimately, they suffered a catastrophic loss of 28 percentage points, the worst ever suffered by a party in post-war Austria. They finished on 16.8%, a distant second place behind the Social Democratic Party of Austria (SPÖ), which won 37.1%. The Austrian People's Party (ÖVP) retained third place, but declined to 14.4%. Apart from the SPÖ, other beneficiaries of the FPK's collapse were The Greens, Team Stronach, and Alliance for the Future of Austria (BZÖ), who each made significant gains.

Background
Prior to amendments made in 2017, the Carinthian constitution mandated that cabinet positions in the state government (state councillors) be allocated between parties proportionally in accordance with the share of votes won by each; this is known as Proporz. As such, the government was a perpetual coalition of all parties that qualified for at least one state councillor.

In 2005, then-Governor and former federal leader of the Freedom Party of Austria (FPÖ) Jörg Haider split from the party due to internal disputes, and founded the Alliance for the Future of Austria (BZÖ). The Freedom Party in Carinthia, then the FPÖ's state branch and led by Haider, changed its allegiance and became the Carinthian branch of the BZÖ. The large majority of its leadership and structure followed, with only a small minority defecting to the FPÖ's new Carinthian branch. Shortly after the 2008 federal election, Haider was killed in a car accident. He was succeeded by Gerhard Dörfler, who became the new Governor of Carinthia and leader of the FPK. In the 2009 Carinthian state election, Dörfler led the party to a strong victory under the name "Freedom Party in Carinthia – BZÖ List Jörg Haider". The FPÖ's new state branch won 3.8%, failing to enter the Landtag.

In December 2009, the FPK split from the BZÖ in protest of new federal leader Josef Bucher's policies, becoming an independent party operating in Carinthia. The party announced it would support the FPÖ on a national level, while the FPÖ's state branch would be dissolved. The FPÖ and FPK compared their new relationship to that of the CDU/CSU in Germany. The BZÖ subsequently founded a new Carinthian branch to compete with the FPK.

Between 2009 and 2013, Dörfler's government suffered a string of scandals involving current and former government officials, including the late Haider. In January 2010, Vice Governor Uwe Scheuch was exposed for offering Austrian citizenship to a Russian investor in exchange for investments in Carinthia and donations to the then-BZÖ. Scheuch resigned from all political positions in mid-2012 and was found guilty in December. In July 2012, a government tax consultant was caught up in a corruption scandal involving the FPK and BZÖ, which led to an early election being scheduled for March 2013.

Electoral system
The 36 seats of the Landtag of Carinthia are elected via open list proportional representation in a two-step process. The seats are distributed between four multi-member constituencies. For parties to receive any representation in the Landtag, they must either win at least one seat in a constituency directly, or clear a 5 percent state-wide electoral threshold. Seats are distributed in constituencies according to the Hare quota, with any remaining seats allocated using the D'Hondt method at the state level, to ensure overall proportionality between a party's vote share and its share of seats.

Contesting parties
The table below lists parties represented in the previous Landtag.

In addition to the parties already represented in the Landtag, six parties collected enough signatures to be placed on the ballot.

 Team Stronach (TS)
 Alliance for the Future of Austria (BZÖ)
 Pirate Party of Austria (PIRAT)
 Livable Party of Austria (LPÖ)
 Social Alliance Carinthia (ASOK)
 List Strong (STARK)

Results

Results by constituency

References

State elections in Austria
2013 elections in Austria
March 2013 events in Europe